The Accidents & Accusations World Tour was a concert tour by the Dixie Chicks. It was their first tour where tickets were sold after the scandal which ensued in 2003 when lead singer Natalie Maines publicly criticized President George W. Bush at Shepherd's Bush Empire in London during the Top of the World Tour, leading to intense criticism of the group. The tour was named after the lyrics in the song "Easy Silence" from the album Taking the Long Way, released  in May 2006.

History

The North American leg of the tour was announced on May 18, 2006, for approximately 60 shows to run from late July  through early November. While the Chicks' 2003 Top of the World Tour also took place after the Bush controversy, most of the tickets had already been sold beforehand, and it was the top-grossing country tour of that year.  Despite good sales figures for the new Taking the Long Way album, however, initial ticket sales for the Accidents & Accusations Tour were far below expectations. Four dates in Memphis, Oklahoma City, Fresno, and Indianapolis were dropped from the tour schedule.  In Houston, tickets never went on sale, with the concert promoter noting that local radio stations "wouldn't even accept our advertising money."
Arenas holding 15,000 capacity were only selling 5,000–6,000 seats, sometimes less.

Industry observers thought the tour might have to be postponed or at least downsized to smaller venues, as for example Mariah Carey did on her 2003 Charmbracelet World Tour, but in the end the Chicks initially kept on schedule and stayed in arenas. Some Northeastern areas did better, and shows in Canada did best, with an Air Canada Centre show in Toronto selling out almost immediately, resulting in a second show being added and Calgary's Saddledome having two shows as well in Winnipeg at the MTS Centre. Meanwhile, the tour began. The Chicks first performed a quick mini-leg of two concerts in London as part of their promotional activities for the June 12 international release of Taking the Long Way. Indeed, their first concert performance in almost two years (since October 2004's Vote for Change shows) was on June 15 at the Shepherd's Bush Empire, the so-called "scene of the crime" of Maines' remark regarding President Bush.  In a show that was broadcast live by MSN and called "Scene of the Crime", Maines said from the stage, "And all week, the only thing people keep asking is, 'What are you gonna say? Do you know what you're gonna say?'  As usual I didn't plan anything, but I thought I'd say something brand new and just say, 'Just so you know, we're ashamed the President of the United States is from Texas.'" This was met with thunderous applause and cheers.

The North American leg began as scheduled on July 21, 2006 at Joe Louis Arena in Detroit. The tour itinerary continued to suffer cancellations in the United States, while adding shows in Canada, where the new album and its singles were getting better radio airplay. An early leg show such as the July 25 one in Philadelphia's Wachovia Center, where sales had been reported as strong, still featured ten upper level sections empty and covered with black tarps.  However, a show of hands taken by Maines indicated that a third or more of the fans were attending their first Chicks concert, which boded well for the group building a new audience.  Continuing the ups and downs of the tour, the August 2 show at Jones Beach Theatre in Wantagh, New York was postponed due to extreme heat and humidity from the 2006 North American heat wave.

On August 4, a revised tour schedule was finally announced.  From the original May schedule, 14 shows had now been cancelled due to poor sales, including dates in Kansas City, Houston, St. Louis, Knoxville, Des Moines, Glendale, Arizona, and Sunrise, Florida in addition to those previously mentioned. Several other late summer/early fall dates had been pushed back into later in the fall, including ones in Nashville, Los Angeles, Denver, and Phoenix. Compared to the original schedule, the total number of North American shows was still roughly the same, due to the addition of a large number of shows in Canada (where Taking the Long Way had proved extremely popular, going five-times-platinum); 15 of the 41 North American shows were now scheduled for north of the border, a strikingly high proportion for an American act.  (Mariah Carey's concurrent The Adventures of Mimi Tour had also increased its Canadian dates, although not to this extent; her management said the Canadian market was hot and favorable exchange rates made playing there attractive.) Dates were also announced for Australia, where Taking the Long Way had been number one on the country albums for the three months since its release. The rescheduling also supposedly helped make room for promotion of the September 2006 documentary film Dixie Chicks: Shut Up and Sing, which, when released, contained a few behind-the-scenes and on-stage scenes from the beginning of the tour. During interviews for that film, Maines said in reference to the tour, "We’ve basically been playing to about half the audience as on the last tour, but it's a different audience. They just look good ... In the past, I think we always thought, Oh, we have a purpose to entertain them and they were there to absorb that and soak it up and be entertaining. They bought their ticket. Now you feel like they feel they have a purpose, supporting free speech and supporting us."

Blogger
The Dixie Chicks became the first major band to hire a designated blogger "all-access" to keep up with them in their promotional activities and tour. They partnered with Microsoft and hired Junichi P. Semitsu, a Professor of Law at the University of San Diego, as the first designated blogger ever hired, to write first-hand accounts for their Accidents & Accusations Tour at their MSN website. Having to give Semitsu a title, the band finally decided on Management Assistant, to allow him all-access entry on tour and at home.  Slowly, this was laughingly shortened to "Man. Ass.", with Semitsu finding at least as much humor as the Chicks.

The show

Unlike the Top of the World Tour, where the arena staging had been in the round with the use of an elaborate set and scrims, the Accidents & Accusations Tour featured a conventional arena layout and a bare stage. One video screen was above the stage; in addition, semi-abstract images were projected onto lighted bead curtains behind the stage (somewhat similar to those used on U2's Vertigo Tour but less effective here due to the lack of anything on the other side).  Entrance music was subversively chosen to be the militaristic Presidential theme "Hail to the Chief".

Stage patter was kept at a minimum during the Accidents & Accusations Tour, with Chicks Martie Maguire and Emily Robison generally saying nothing at all.  Explicit political comments were kept to a minimum;   Maines typically alluded to "the incident" only before "Lullaby", where she wryly stressed that in addition to being "mad as hell", they were all loving, affectionate mothers.  But the situation is still not far from her mind.  At the July 22 show in Pittsburgh, Pennsylvania, Maines lost track of the lyrics to the entrance music, and quipped "I feel like the president. I can't think of what to say."  More pointedly, during their first show in Canada, at the Halifax Metro Centre on August 8, Maines said "I gotta tell you, it is nice to be in a country where you're not worried about them spitting in your face."

Maines was a more prominent instrumentalist than before, playing electric guitar, acoustic guitar, Omnichord, and handling the bass guitar duties on "Goodbye Earl".  Effective use was made of two-part harmonies, with either Maguire or Robison backing Maines, to give an edgier vocal sound, which would then sometimes be resolved into the expected three-part harmonies.

The set list consisted of mostly material from Taking the Long Way and the prior Home, with a scattering of big hits and concert favorites from before that.

The emotional (and actual) center of the show was clearly "Not Ready to Make Nice", the Chicks' defiant response to the controversy and the death threats they received and first single from Taking the Long Way.  It came after two bluegrass rave-ups, the second with Maines offstage resting.  The quiet, ominous first notes of the song brought a rush of applause from the audience, Maines delivered the vocals with a focused intensity, the crescendo after the lines about the crazed response to her words brought another visceral audience reaction.  The animations that played behind the band recapitulated the black liquid splashes from the music video of Not Ready to Make Nice: the splashing black liquid looked like oil, explosions, and at times even perhaps blood.  The song completed on a quiet note again the house lights went partly up as the crowd typically gave very prolonged applause. She then followed this with the respite of "Easy Silence", which precedes it on the album.

Other highlights included a crowd-rousing "Goodbye Earl", "Landslide" with harmonies rearranged into a higher register and giving an almost unworldly feel, a confident "The Long Way Around", a lyrical "Cowboy Take Me Away", and a stunning "Top of the World" with Maguire joining the band's cellist and second violinist to lead an extended string section coda.  First encore "Travelin' Soldier" was the only number performed by just the three Chicks, with Maines having her most prominent guitar part.

Opening acts
Anna Nalick (North America, Summer, select shows)
Bob Schneider (North America, Summer, select shows)
Pete Yorn (Australia) (North America, Fall, select shows)

Setlist
"Overture" (contains elements of "Hail to the Chief")
"Lubbock or Leave It"
"Truth No. 2"
"Goodbye Earl"
"The Long Way Around"
"Landslide"  
"Everybody Knows"  
"I Like It"
"Cowboy Take Me Away"  
"Lullaby" 
"White Trash Wedding" 
"Lil' Jack Slade" 
"Not Ready To Make Nice"  
"Easy Silence"
"Long Time Gone"
"Some Days You Gotta Dance"  
"So Hard" 
"Top of the World"  
"Wide Open Spaces"  
"Sin Wagon"  
Encore 		
"Travelin’ Soldier"
"Mississippi" 
"Ready to Run"

Tour dates

Cancellations and rescheduled shows

The band
 Natalie Maines – lead vocals, acoustic guitar, electric guitar, bass guitar, omnichord, tambourine
 Martie Maguire – fiddle, violin, mandolin, harmony vocals
 Emily Robison – banjo, dobro, acoustic guitar, electric guitar, harmony vocals
 David Grissom – electric guitar, backing vocals, band leader
 Keith Sewell – acoustic guitar, backing vocals?
 Fred Eltringham – drums
 Audley Freed – electric guitar, acoustic guitar, mandolin, backing vocals
 Larry Knechtel – keyboards
 Sebastian Steinberg – bass guitar, backing vocals
 Pete Finney – pedal steel guitar
 John Krovoza – cello
 Janna Jacoby – violin

External links
 Dixie Chicks Website

References

The Chicks concert tours
2006 concert tours